Tonquin may refer to:

Ships
 Tonquin (1807), an American merchant vessel destroyed on Vancouver Island in 1811
 Tonquin (1845), a later American commercial vessel that sank in 1849 near San Francisco, CA
 SS City of Paris (1865), a French steamship briefly named Tonquin that sank in 1885

Locations
 Tonquin Valley, a valley located in Alberta
 Tonquin Pass, a mountain pass in the Canadian Rockies
 Tonquin, Oregon, an unincorporated locale of Oregon

Vietnam
 Tonkin, the northern region of Vietnam
 Tonquin War, an alternative name for the Sino-French War

Plants
 Tonquin bean, a flowering pea tree native to Central and South America